Meisam Mirzaei Talarposhti (born April 15, 1992) is an Iranian basketball player for the Iranian national team.

He participated at the 2017 FIBA Asia Cup.

References

1992 births
Living people
Iranian men's basketball players
Sportspeople from Tehran
Centers (basketball)
Basketball players at the 2018 Asian Games
Asian Games silver medalists for Iran
Medalists at the 2018 Asian Games
Asian Games medalists in basketball